The Italian Communist Party (PCI) is a minor communist party in Italy.

History 
The PCI, which took the name from the 1926–1991 Italian Communist Party, emerged in 2016 from the merger of the Communist Party of Italy (PCdI) with splinters from the Communist Refoundation Party (PRC) and minor groups. The foundation of the new PCI took place ninety years after the transformation of the old Communist Party of Italy into the old PCI.

After the founding congress, Mauro Alboresi was elected secretary by the party's newly formed national committee.

In the 2018 general election, the PCI was part of the Power to the People electoral list, which obtained 1.1% of the vote and no seats. Soon after, the party left the list. In July the PCI held its first regular congress.

In July 2022 the PCI, together with other far-left parties and organizations (Confederation of the Italian Left, Atheist Democracy, Inventing the Future, The Future City, CARC Party and Italian Marxist–Leninist Party), formed the "Popular Unity" coordination, with the aim of elaborating and implementing common and shared initiatives and proposals. However, in the 2022 general election the PCI ran as a stand-alone list in 5 out 29 constituencies for the Chamber of Deputies and 7 out of 21 for the Senate, obtaining between 1.0 and 1.5% in Tuscany, Marche and Umbria.

Leadership 
 Secretary: Mauro Alboresi (2016–present)
 President: Manuela Palermi (2016–2018), Selene Prodi (2018–present)
 Coordinator: Giacomo De Angelis (2018–present)

Election results

Italian Parliament

Regional Councils

References

External links 
Official website

Left-wing politics in Italy
2016 establishments in Italy
Communist parties in Italy
Eurosceptic parties in Italy
Political parties established in 2016
International Meeting of Communist and Workers Parties